Faisal Qureshi (فیصل قریشی) or Faysal Qureshi may refer to:
 Faisal Qureshi (television personality) (born 1964), Pakistani television actor and director
 Faysal Qureshi (actor) (born 1973), Pakistani actor and television host